Flavia Domitilla may refer to:

Flavia Domitilla the Elder, the wife of the Roman Emperor Vespasian
Flavia Domitilla the Younger, Vespasian's only daughter
Flavia Domitilla (wife of Clemens), granddaughter of Vespasian